Smrz is a surname. Notable people with the surname include:

Brian Smrz
Jakub Smrž (born 1983), Czech motorcycle road racer
Brett Smrz